Giordano Ferrari (born 23 January 1956) is a retired Italian high jumper. He won one medal, at senior level, at the International athletics competitions.

Biography
He finished seventh at the 1975 European Indoor Championships and won the gold medal at the 1975 Mediterranean Games. His personal best jump is 2.20 metres, achieved in May 1975 in Fiorano Modenese. He has 8 caps in national team from 1974 to 1975.

See also
 Men's high jump Italian record progression

References

External links
 
Giordano Ferrari at All-athletics.com

1956 births
Living people
Italian male high jumpers
Mediterranean Games gold medalists for Italy
Athletes (track and field) at the 1975 Mediterranean Games
Mediterranean Games medalists in athletics
Athletics competitors of Centro Sportivo Carabinieri